is a construction and real estate engaged company based in Japan. Its headquarters are in Minato-ku, Tokyo. The company is listed on the Tokyo and Nagoya Stock Exchange and is a constituent of the TOPIX Large70 stock index.

Overview 

The company operates in four business segments. The construction segment is engaged in the planning, design and construction of contracted works; the real estate segment is engaged in the brokerage, management and leasing of real estates; the financial segment is involved in the construction loan business and fire reinsurance business; the others segment is engaged in the sale of fuel, the operation of day service centers and hotels, the printing and delivery of documents, the investment in hotel companies and cultivation of agricultural produce.

Scandals / Incidents 
Employee overwork suicide
In 2009, the bereaved families appealed Daito Trust Construction to the Shizuoka District Court for the employee, who committed suicide as he was forced to supplementation 3.6 million yen arisen from the company, long hours of work and sales norms.

Employee suicide by power harassment
In 2010, Shimada Labor Standards Inspection Office (Shimada-shi, Shizuoka Prefecture) certified that employee suicide is caused by the power harassment from the boss.

Employee hits a customer with a hammer
On December 25, 2015, a construction manager at Matsumoto Branch (Matsumoto City, Nagano Prefecture) hit the head and face of customers and their families with a hammer to injure them.
In the trial on November 9, 2017, he has been prosecuted for a total of six cases including arson, two fraud charges, theft and building damage, including the above events.

References

External links 

 

Real estate companies based in Tokyo
Construction and civil engineering companies based in Tokyo
Companies listed on the Tokyo Stock Exchange
Companies listed on the Nagoya Stock Exchange
Construction and civil engineering companies established in 1974
Real estate companies established in 1974
Conglomerate companies established in 1974
Japanese companies established in 1974